Holospira arizonensis, common name the Arizona holospira, is a species of air-breathing land snail, a terrestrial pulmonate gastropod mollusk in the family Urocoptidae.

References

External links 
 Manual of Conchology. 15, Urocoptidae. pages 81-82.

Urocoptidae
Gastropods described in 1890